The William Hicklen House is a historic house at 502 Beaver Valley Road in Talleyville, Delaware.  The house is a rare 18th-century plank-frame house, built by an early settler of the area.  A stone wing was added to the house prior to 1800, and it was further enlarged in the 19th century.

The house was listed on the National Register of Historic Places in 1983.

See also
National Register of Historic Places listings in northern New Castle County, Delaware

References

External links
Delaware Greenways map with house location

Houses on the National Register of Historic Places in Delaware
Houses completed in 1725
Houses in New Castle County, Delaware
1725 establishments in Delaware
National Register of Historic Places in New Castle County, Delaware